Henrik Rød (born 14 September 1975 in Halden) is a Norwegian politician for the Progress Party.

He was elected to the Norwegian Parliament from Østfold in 2001, but was not re-elected in 2005. Instead he serves as a deputy representative during the term 2005–2009.

Rød was a member of the executive committee of Halden city council during the terms 1995–1999 and 1999–2003.

References

1975 births
Living people
Progress Party (Norway) politicians
Members of the Storting
People from Halden
Østfold politicians
21st-century Norwegian politicians